The Show is the debut studio album by American hip hop supergroup eMC. It was released on March 25, 2008 via M3 Records/Traffic Entertainment Group. Production was handled by Frequency, J!, Quincy Tones, Ayatollah, The ARE, Koolade, Marco Polo and Nicolay, with DJ Rob, Filthy Rich and Masta Ace serving as executive producers. Beside members Masta Ace, Punchline, Wordsworth and Strick, it features guest appearances from Adi, Ladybug Mecca, Little Brother, Money Harm and Sean Price.

Background
While it was originally rumored that Ace had retired from music after the release of his acclaimed 2004 concept album A Long Hot Summer, the following year the veteran had formed the new collective with his protégé, Milwaukee rapper Strick, and revered underground lyricists Punch & Words. The four had previously collaborated on numerous albums and tracks, and toured extensively as a collective.

Like Ace's previous albums, A Long Hot Summer and Disposable Arts, The Show is a thematic concept album that tells a story. The album's story follows a day in the life of eMC doing a show on the road.

Singles
The first official eMC track, the Ayatollah-produced "Four Brothers", was released in 2006. A music video for the song was released online on December 10, 2006, however, this track was not included on the album. Music videos were released for "What It Stand For" and "Leak It Out" as well.

Track listing

Personnel

eMC
Duval "Masta Ace" – vocals, mixing, executive producer
Vinson "Wordsworth" Johnson – vocals, recording
Rashaan "Punchline" Truell – vocals
Stephen "Strick" Stricklin – vocals

Technical
Matko "Koolade" Sasek – producer (track 1)
Phillip "The ARE" Gonzalez – producer (tracks: 3, 6)
S. "Quincy Tones" McCaffery – producer (tracks: 5, 17, 22)
Bryan "Frequency" Fryzel – producer (tracks: 8, 10, 23)
J. "J!" Balde – producer (tracks: 9, 15, 18)
Matthijs "Nicolay" Rook – producer (track 12)
Lamont "Ayatollah" Dorrell – producer (tracks: 14, 20)
Marco "Marco Polo" Bruno – producer (track 21)
Filthy Rich – recording, mixing, executive producer
DJ Rob – recording, executive producer
Robert Alphonse – art direction
Francois Bonura – photography
Marvin Anthony – photography
Peter Chin – photography

Guest vocalists
Phonte of Little Brother – vocals (track 5)
Thomas Jones a.k.a. Big Pooh of Little Brother – vocals (track 5)
ADI of Growing Nation – vocals (track 8)
Sean Price a.k.a. Ruck of Heltah Skeltah – vocals (track 9)
Mariana Khalilah Azraa Vieira a.k.a. Ladybug Mecca of Digable Planets – vocals (track 18)
Marvin Moore-Hough a.k.a. Money Harm of The Product G&B – vocals (track 23)
Terrel Howard – additional vocals (track 10)
Adanita Ross – additional vocals (tracks: 12, 15)
Angelita Ross – additional vocals (track 15)

Musicians
DJ Eclipse – scratches (track 12)
Anthony Lucas – bass (track 20)

"The Cast"
Paul Nice as Adam
Amanda Diva
Eternia as Club MP3 Voicemail
Stephen Mills aka FaTone as Merch Man
Torae as security guard
Marco Polo as boyfriend
April Hill as fan
Katrina Chambers as hotel manager

References

External links

2008 albums
Concept albums
Masta Ace albums
Wordsworth (rapper) albums
Albums produced by Ayatollah
Albums produced by Marco Polo
Albums produced by Nicolay (musician)
Albums produced by Frequency (record producer)